The goiter blacksmelt (Bathylagus euryops) is a species of deep-sea smelt found in the North Atlantic Ocean.
It is the biomass-dominant pelagic fish over the Mid-Atlantic Ridge when the entire water column is fully considered. 
No topographic trapping can be performed on the species as they do not vertically migrate.

References 
 
 at ITIS.gov

Bathylagus
Fish of the Atlantic Ocean
Fish described in 1896